The Print Room at Windsor Castle is a print room which is an office in the Royal Collection Department of the Royal Household of the Sovereign of the United Kingdom. It is responsible for the care and maintenance of the royal collections of drawings and old master prints, including watercolours. The term refers to both an institution and a room, and is under the direction of the Head of Prints and Drawings, currently Martin Clayton MVO.

The collection is exceptionally strong, with famous holdings of drawings by Leonardo da Vinci (550), Raphael, Michelangelo and Hans Holbein the Younger (85).  A large part of the Old Master drawings were acquired by George III.

References

British art

Printmaking
Windsor Castle
Royal Collection of the United Kingdom